Brian Hindley (born 1944) was a professional rugby league footballer who played for Warrington RLFC between 1962 and 1963. He made his professional debut in February 1962, aged 17.

References

External links
Warrington profile

1944 births
English rugby league players
Living people
Rugby league centres
Warrington Wolves players